Agios Petros is a mountain village and a community in the municipality of North Kynouria in southeastern Arcadia, Greece. It is considered a traditional settlement. In 2011 its population was 675 for the village and 717 for the community, which includes the village Xirokampi and the Malevi monastery. It is situated in the northern part of the Parnon mountains, at about 950 m elevation. It is 3 km south of Elatos, 5 km east of Vourvoura, 6 km northeast of Karyes (Laconia), 18 km southwest of Astros and 26 km southeast of Tripoli.

Population

Notable people
Nilus the Myrrh-streamer (1601–1651), an Orthodox Christian saint and ascetic

See also
List of settlements in Arcadia
List of traditional settlements of Greece

References

External links
Arcadia - Agios Petros

Populated places in Arcadia, Peloponnese